The Federal Bar Association (FBA) is the primary voluntary professional organization for private and government lawyers and judges practicing and sitting in federal courts in the United States. Six times a year, The Association prints The Federal Lawyer, which includes the latest news of interest to the federal legal community. The magazine features articles by attorneys and judges, book reviews, the latest Supreme Court rulings, judicial profiles, and thorough coverage of FBA activities.

Background
The Federal Bar Association is an income tax exempt (501-C6) organization, founded in 1920. The purpose of the FBA is:

To serve as the national representative of the Federal legal profession; 
To promote the sound administration of justice; 
To enhance the professional growth and development of members of the Federal legal profession; 
To promote high standards of professional competence and ethical conduct in the Federal legal profession; 
To promote the welfare of attorneys and judges employed by the Government of the United States; 
To provide meaningful service for the welfare and benefit of the members of the Association; 
To provide quality education programs to the Federal legal profession and the public; 
To keep members informed of developments in their respective fields of interest; 
To keep members informed of the affairs of the Association, to encourage their involvement in its activities, and to provide members opportunities to assume leadership roles; 
To promote professional and social interaction among members of the Federal legal profession

Foundation of the Federal Bar Association
The Foundation of the Federal Bar Association holds a congressional charter under Title 36 of the United States Code as a (501-C3) organization in 1954. 

The Foundation’s mission is to:

 Promote and support legal research and education;
 Advance the science of jurisprudence;
 Facilitate the administration of justice;
 and Foster improvements in the practice of Federal law.

Contributions to the Foundation of the Federal Bar Association and its restricted funds may be treated charitable contributions for tax purposes.

Chapters
The Federal Bar Association has nearly 100 local chapters across the country and in Puerto Rico and the U.S. Virgin Islands. Local chapters provide benefits, including:

 Networking opportunities with federal judiciary and other practitioners
 More than 700 hours of CLE credit
 Focus on legislative issues at the local, state, and national level
 Leadership opportunities on both the local and national level
 Membership communications such as newsletters and e-communications

Sections
The FBA has 24 substantive law sections. In addition to networking opportunities, many sections distribute quarterly newsletters providing current information on their particular area of the law.
 Admiralty Law Section
 Alternative Dispute Resolution Section
 Antitrust & Trade Regulation Section
 Banking Law Section
 Bankruptcy Law Section
 Civil Rights Law Section
 Criminal Law Section
 Environment, Energy & Natural Resources Section
 Federal Litigation Section
 Government Contracts Section
 Health Law Section
 Immigration Law Section
 Indian Law Section
 Intellectual Property Section
 International Law Section
 Labor & Employment Law Section
 LGBT Law Section
 Qui Tam Section
 Section on Taxation
 Securities Law Section
 Social Security Law Section
 State & Local Government Relations Section
 Transportation & Transportation Security Law Section
 Veterans & Military Law Section

Divisions
The FBA has 6 career divisions: 
 Corporate and Association Counsel Division
 Federal Career Service Division
 Judiciary Division
 Law Student Division
 Senior Lawyers Division
 Younger Lawyers Division

External links
 http://www.fedbar.org/

References

American bar associations
Organizations established in 1920
1920 establishments in the United States